Blair Currie (born 19 February 1994) is a Scottish footballer who plays as a goalkeeper for Stirling Albion.

Early and personal life
Currie's brother Max is also a footballer, who plays as a goalkeeper for Airdrieonians.

Career
Currie began his playing career as a youth for Rangers at the age of seven. He worked his way up to the under-19 squad, where he was back up to fellow keeper Alan Smith. On the opening day of the 2012 January transfer window, Currie joined Scottish First Division side Hamilton Academical on an emergency loan until the end of the season.

Currie was an unused substitute on 14 occasions, before he made his debut as a substitute against Falkirk on 10 April 2012, following the sending off of David Hutton. At the time he was the youngest goalkeeper playing first team football in the UK. In all he made four appearances before returning to Rangers.

He was released by Hamilton at the end of the 2014–15 season. On 15 July 2015, Currie signed for Annan Athletic, agreeing a one-year contract. After two seasons with Annan, Currie left the club to join former Annan manager Jim Chapman at league rivals Clyde in June 2017.

At the end of Season 18–19, Currie opted to join Stirling Albion.

Career statistics

References

External links

Living people
1993 births
Footballers from Glasgow
Scottish footballers
Association football goalkeepers
Rangers F.C. players
Hamilton Academical F.C. players
Annan Athletic F.C. players
Clyde F.C. players
Stirling Albion F.C. players
Scottish Football League players
Scottish Professional Football League players